Mount Tod is a mountain on the southwest side of Auster Glacier, at the head of Amundsen Bay in Enderby Land. Plotted from air photos taken from ANARE (Australian National Antarctic Research Expeditions) aircraft in 1956. Named by Antarctic Names Committee of Australia (ANCA) for I. M. Tod, weather observer at Mawson Station in 1961.

References
 

Tod, Mount